Gilda Lousek (9 November 1937 – 29 October 1998) was an Argentine actress. She appeared in more than sixty films from 1956 to 1992.

Filmography

References

External links 

1937 births
1998 deaths
Argentine film actresses
20th-century Argentine actresses
Actresses from Buenos Aires
Burials at La Chacarita Cemetery